Saturninus may refer to:

 Lucius Appuleius Saturninus (died 100 BC), tribune, legislator
 Gaius Sentius Saturninus, consul 19 BC, military officer, governor
 Marcus Aponius Saturninus (1st century AD), governor of Moesia, and partisan of first Vitellius, then Vespasian (emperors)
 Lucius Antonius Saturninus (79 AD), provincial governor and rebel against emperor Domitian
 Saturninus of Antioch (fl. 100–120), early gnostic
 Saturninus Empiricus, (c. 200 AD), Pyrrhonist philosopher and physician in the Empiric school of medicine. Student of Sextus Empiricus
 Saturninus (253-268), rebel against emperor Gallienus
 Julius Saturninus (died 280), provincial governor and rebel against emperor Probus
 Saturninus (consul 383), Roman consul in 383
 The Emperor in William Shakespeare's play Titus Andronicus

See also
Saint-Saturnin (disambiguation)
Saint Saturninus (disambiguation)
Saturnin
Saturnina
Saturnine (disambiguation)
Saturnino (disambiguation)